"Fifteen Feet of Pure White Snow" is a song by Nick Cave and the Bad Seeds from their 2001 album, No More Shall We Part. It is also the second single from the album.

It has a promotional video featuring the band playing live in a former building of the Central Committee of the Communist Party of Kazakhstan, with people dancing around, some of which are famous musicians such as Jarvis Cocker of Pulp, Jason Donovan, Noah Taylor and several others.

References 

Nick Cave songs
2001 singles
Songs written by Nick Cave
Mute Records singles
2000 songs